Michael L. Perlin is an American lawyer and professor at the New York Law School. He is an internationally recognized expert on "mental disability law" and how the legal system deals with individuals with mental disorders or intellectual disability. He has authored over 23 books and nearly 300 scholarly articles on the subject.

Biography
Perlin started practicing law in New Jersey, US as a public criminal defense lawyer and mental health advocate for people with mental disabilities, and joined the New York Law School faculty in 1984. In 1985 he filed an amicus brief in Ake v. Oklahoma, in which the Supreme Court ruled that a person who is indigent has a right to receive a psychiatric evaluation, provided by the state, in cases where the insanity defense is being used.

Perlin has written extensively about "sanism", a concept created from the term "sane" by lawyer-physician Morton Birnbaum. Perlin refers to the widespread prejudice and discrimination that "permeates all aspects of mental disability law and affects all participants in the mental disability law system: litigants, fact finders, counsel, and expert and lay witnesses."

In 1996 Perlin wrote an article criticizing the Supreme Court decision Godinez v. Moran, as its repercussions were evident in what was widely considered a "charade" trial of mass murderer Colin Ferguson. Perlin entitled his paper "Dignity was the First to Leave" and since then has used Bob Dylan lyrics to name all of his scholarly law articles.

Perlin has said that he sums up the essence of his attempt to educate society about the manner in which sanist bias prevents equal justice in his ninth book The Hidden Prejudice: Mental Disability on Trial (2001). Professor of psychiatry Harvey Bluestone concluded in review that all psychiatrists should read Perlin, even though he sometimes presents them as responsible for alleged sanism.

Perlin sat on the board of the International Academy of Law and Mental Health for 20 years and worked extensively with Mental Disability Rights International, providing training and workshops in nations such as Hungary and Latvia. Since the receipt of funding in 2008, and as part of his work with the Justice Action Center, Perlin has been collaborating with advocates from Japan, Australia, and the Pacific Rim to create the Disability Rights Tribunal for Asia and the Pacific (DRTAP).

Bibliography

Personal life
Perlin has played clarinet for the Lawrence Township Community Band, and is a fan of baseball and opera.  Perlin is also a huge fan of Bob Dylan, having seen him many times live and titling many of his law review articles with Dylan lyrics.

References

New York Law School faculty
American disability rights activists
American civil rights lawyers
Year of birth missing (living people)
Living people
New Jersey lawyers